Tender Touches has run three seasons. Its first and second seasons consists of five eleven-minute episodes as well as "operetta" episodes which are basically the same but musical.

Series overview 
{| class="wikitable" style="text-align:center;"
|-
! colspan="2" rowspan="2" |Season
! rowspan="2" |Episodes
! colspan="2" |Originally aired
|-
! First aired
! Last aired
|-
| style="background:#003AF8|
| 1
| 7.5
| December 18, 2017
| December 22, 2017
|-
| style="background:#FF6229|
| 2
| 7.5
| November 26, 2018
| November 30, 2018
|-
| style="background:#FFD300|
| 3
| 5
| June 15, 2020
| June 19, 2020
|-
|}

Episodes

Season 1 (2017)

Season 2 (2018)

Season 3 (2020)

References 
Informational notes

Citations

Lists of American adult animated television series episodes